Dónall na Buile Mac Cárthaigh, Irish poet, fl. 1730s–40s.

Mac Cárthaigh was a member of an ancient Munster dynasty. He was a supporter of the Jacobite cause.

See also
 Kings of Munster
 Kings of Desmond
 Diarmuid mac Sheáin Bhuí Mac Cárthaigh,  d. 1705
 Eoghan an Mhéirín Mac Cárthaigh, 1691–1756.
 Liam Rua Mac Coitir, 1675/90?–1738.
 Donnchadh Ruadh Mac Conmara, 1715–1810.

References
 Ireland And The Jacobite Cause, 1685–1766: A Fatal Attachment, p. 228, 336, Éamonn Ó Ciardha, Four Courts Press, 2001, 2004.

Irish poets
Irish-language poets
Irish Jacobites
People from County Cork
18th-century Irish people